John Keeling (1586–1649) was an English lawyer and politician who sat in the House of Commons in 1625 and 1626.

Keeling was from Staffordshire. He matriculated at Brasenose College, Oxford on 23 November 1593, aged 17 and was awarded BA from St Mary Hall, Oxford on 14 December 1599. In 1618 he was called to the bar at Inner Temple and was awarded MA on 1 August 1621. In 1625, he was elected Member of Parliament for Newcastle-under-Lyme.  He was of Humberton, Hackney, Middlesex and later of Hadleigh, Essex.

References

1586 births
1649 deaths
English lawyers
Alumni of Brasenose College, Oxford
Alumni of St Mary Hall, Oxford
Members of the Inner Temple
17th-century English lawyers
Members of the Parliament of England for Newcastle-under-Lyme
English MPs 1625
English MPs 1626